Qarajelu (also Romanized as Qarājelū; also known as Qarah Āghājlū) is a village in Qarah Su Rural District, in the Central District of Khoy County, West Azerbaijan Province, Iran. At the 2006 census, its population was 49, in 12 families.

References 

Populated places in Khoy County